Cirque du Freak: The Vampire's Assistant is a 2009 American fantasy film loosely based on the Vampire Blood trilogy of the book series The Saga of Darren Shan by author Darren Shan.  The first three books in the 12-part series — Cirque du Freak, The Vampire’s Assistant, and Tunnels of Blood — inspired the film. The film received mixed reviews and was a commercial failure.

Plot
In an unnamed American town, teenagers Darren Shan and Steve Leonard, Darren's more rebellious best friend and classmate, sneak out at night to attend the Cirque du Freak freak show at a local theater. During the performance, Steve recognizes one of the troupe's members, Larten Crepsley, as a vampire who is over a hundred years old, prompting him to try to find Crepsley after the show. Meanwhile, Darren, fascinated by Crepsley's spider, Madam Octa, goes backstage, and impulsively steals her, but is forced to hide when Crepsley returns to his green room. Steve arrives, begging to be made into a vampire, but Crepsley refuses after tasting Steve's blood, which he says "tastes of evil." When Crepsley realizes that Madam Octa was stolen, Darren flees from the theater with Crepsley in pursuit. He escapes when the mysterious Mr. Tiny arrives in his limousine, accompanied by Murlough. The latter is unimpressed with Darren, dismissing him as a "bag of blood", but Tiny promises to stay in touch after dropping Darren off at his home.

The following day, Darren secretly brings Madam Octa to school, where she escapes. After a struggle in a crowded hallway, Madam Octa bites Steve on the cheek, leaving him to succumb to her deadly venom in the hospital. Darren returns to the theater and begs Crepsley for help. Initially annoyed and contemptuous, Crepsley agrees on the condition that Darren becomes a half-vampire—and Crepsley's personal assistant. Darren agrees, only to flee while Crepsley administers the antidote to Steve. However, after nearly attacking his own sister out of vampiric bloodlust, Darren decides to leave with Crepsley, who uses magic to stage Darren's death of a fall from a roof.

After being buried in a cemetery, Crepsley digs up the grave to free Darren, but Murlough ambushes them. Crepsley fights him off and the two go to the Cirque du Freak campgrounds, where Darren meets Evra Von, the snake boy, and Rebecca, the monkey girl. Meanwhile, Steve, contemplating suicide after losing his best friend, is stopped by Tiny, who offers him a chance to become a Vampaneze, a race of vampires who—unlike Crepsley and others—murder their victims to feed on their blood. Steve agrees, proceeding to kill high school history teacher Mr. Kersey with Murlough's help. Trying to instigate a confrontation between Steve and Darren, Tiny kidnaps Rebecca and Darren's family, leaving a flyer for the Cirque du Freak at Darren's former home.

At the theater, Crepsley and Murlough fight while Darren fights with Steve but Darren's refusal to feed weakens him. Rebecca frees herself using her monkey tail and offers Darren a taste of her blood. After some hesitation, he accepts. Crepsley stabs Murlough, and with his dying words, Murlough declares that the truce between the two vampire clans has been broken. Tiny (who had been watching from the balcony via opera glasses) eventually separates Steve and Darren. Darren asks Steve to stay with him, but Steve refuses, saying, "I have my destiny and you have yours." Steve then leaves with Tiny, who plans to groom him as a Vampaneze leader.

Crepsley returns Darren's family to their home, hypnotizing them so they'll forget what they've been through. Rebecca and Darren share a heartfelt kiss before returning to the campgrounds, where Crepsley gives Darren a coffin to sleep in, and Darren accepts his new life as a member of the Cirque du Freak.

Cast

 Chris Massoglia as Darren Shan
 John C. Reilly as Larten Crepsley
 Josh Hutcherson as Steve "Leopard" Leonard 
 Ray Stevenson as Murlough
 Salma Hayek as Madame Truska
 Patrick Fugit as Evra Von
 Jessica Carlson as Rebecca (Monkey Girl)
 Michael Cerveris as Desmond Tiny (Mr. Destiny)
 Willem Dafoe as Gavner Purl
 Ken Watanabe as Hibernius Tall
 Jane Krakowski as Corma Limbs
 Kristen Schaal as Gertha Teeth
 Orlando Jones as Alexander Ribs
 Frankie Faison as Rhamus Twobellies
 Morgan Saylor as Annie Shan
 Don McManus as Dermot Shan
 Colleen Camp as Angela Shan
 Patrick Breen as Mr. Kersey
 Jonathan Nosan as Hans Hands
 Tom Woodruff, Jr. as The Wolfman
 Blake Nelson Boyd as Mr. Afraid of the Ground Man

Production
Cirque du Freak: The Vampire's Assistant was filmed between February 19-June 1, 2008 in New Orleans, Folsom, and Baton Rouge, Louisiana. Some of the characters required extensive prosthetics and makeup, which was led by Steve Koch, Brian Sipe, and Mark Garbarino. Prosthetics did not quite add the height needed on certain shots for the character of Mr. Tall, played by Academy Award-nominated Ken Watanabe. Although Watanabe is six feet tall, a body double was cast for some scenes to accentuate the abnormal height of the character Mr. Tall. Trevon Flores, a local basketball player who stands 6'10" tall and weighs 210 pounds, was used cast as the body double. Watanabe also utilized dialogue coaches Kathleen S. Dunn and Francie Brown in pre-production and production to further enhance his performance as the circus barker. Computer-generated imagery was also used to portray other fantasy elements.

John Marshall High School in Los Angeles was used to film some parts of the movie. Sophie B. Wright Charter School in New Orleans was also used to shoot scenes from the film.  A portion was filmed on a set constructed within New Orleans City Park, approximately 1,000 feet off the side of the road, along Harrison Avenue.

Principal photography began on February 8, 2008 in New Orleans and concluded on June 3, 2008.  The film was distributed by Universal Studios.  In one of the manga additions of the saga, the director says that the character of Gavner Purl was a hint of the sequel he wanted to make.

Music
The score to The Vampire's Assistant was composed by Stephen Trask, marking his third feature-film with director Paul Weitz. The score was recorded with an 86-piece ensemble of the Hollywood Studio Symphony at the Newman Scoring Stage at 20th Century Fox. The movie also features the songs "Something Is Not Right with Me" by Cold War Kids, "Chelsea Dagger" by The Fratellis, and "Red Right Hand" by Nick Cave. The trailer features the songs Asleep From Day by The Chemical Brothers, Bliss by Syntax, and Superhero by Immediate Music.

Release
The film was originally set for release on January 15, 2010, but was moved to an earlier release date of October 23, 2009.

Critical reception
Review aggregation website Rotten Tomatoes assigns the film a rating of 38% based on 139 critics with an average rating of 4.87/10. The site's critical consensus reads "This overstuffed, scattershot vampire flick suffers from poor characterization and an unwieldy mix of scares and chuckles." On Metacritic, the film has a score of 43 out of 100, based on 25 reviews, indicating "mixed or average reviews". Audiences polled by CinemaScore gave the film an average grade of "B" on an A+ to F scale.

Box office
The film opened in 2,754 theaters in the United States and made over $14 million, reaching #7 in the charts. In other countries, it made more than $25 million, giving it a worldwide box office total of more than $39 million. On DVD, sales in the United States made more than $5.5 million. The film's chart placings worldwide include reaching #1 in Ukraine, #2 in Hungary, #2 in Russia, #2 in the United Arab Emirates, #3 in Mexico, #3 in Portugal, #4 in Egypt, #4 in Venezuela, #5 in Belgium, #5 in Peru, #5 in Singapore, #5 in the United Kingdom, #6 in Lebanon, #6 in the Philippines, #7 in Bulgaria, #7 in Japan, #8 in Chile, #8 in Colombia, #8 in the Netherlands, #9 in Austria, #9 in Romania, #11 in Germany, #11 in Malaysia, #11 in New Zealand.

Home media
The film debuted on DVD and Blu-ray Disc in Canada, the United Kingdom and United States at the end of February 2010. In Canada, by the end of its first week on sale and available to rent, it was #1 on the Rogers DVD bestselling chart, #2 on the Blockbuster Canada bestselling chart, and #6 on the rental charts of both. In the United States it was #2 on the Rentrak bestseller chart, and #6 on the Blockbuster, Home Media and IMDb rental charts. In the United Kingdom it reached #5 on the MyMovies bestsellers chart, and #6 on the Yahoo chart.

Cancelled sequels
In a Reddit AMA in March 2015, Darren Shan stated that three sequels to Cirque du Freak: The Vampire's Assistant had been abandoned by Universal prior to the film's failure, as well as expressing interest in a potential future reboot of the series.

See also
 Vampire films

References

External links

 
 
 

2009 films
American fantasy adventure films
2000s children's fantasy films
Circus films
Films about sideshow performers
Films based on fantasy novels
Films based on Irish novels
Films directed by Paul Weitz
Films produced by Lauren Shuler Donner
Films with screenplays by Brian Helgeland
Films shot in Los Angeles
Films shot in New Orleans
Relativity Media films
Universal Pictures films
Films with screenplays by Paul Weitz
American vampire films
Films scored by Stephen Trask
2000s fantasy adventure films
2000s English-language films
2000s American films

ja:ダレン・シャン (小説)#映画版